Illinois Medical District is a station on the Chicago Transit Authority's 'L' system, serving the Blue Line's Forest Park branch. It is located in the median of the Eisenhower Expressway. Prior to June 25, 2006, the station was known as Medical Center. As the name implies, it primarily serves the Illinois Medical District and Tri-Taylor neighborhood, but is also close to the United Center, home of the Chicago Bulls and Chicago Blackhawks sports teams.

Station Renovation
The $23 million project began in September 2016 and was completed on August 20, 2018.

Bus connections
CTA
  7 Harrison (Weekdays only) 
  50 Damen 
  126 Jackson 

Pace
  755 Plainfield/IMD Express (Weekday Rush Hours only)

Notes and references

Notes

References

External links 

Damen entrance in 1958 @ America on the Move (Smithsonian Institution)
Illinois Medical District Station Page
Damen Avenue entrance from Google Maps Street View
Ogden Avenue entrance from Google Maps Street View
Paulina Street entrance from Google Maps Street View

CTA Blue Line stations
Railway stations in the United States opened in 1958
1958 establishments in Illinois